Himalay Se Ooncha is a 1975 Indian Hindi-language action film directed by B.S. Thapa. The film stars Sunil Dutt as a reluctant mountaineer. The title is based on H. P. S. Ahluwalia's book Higher than the Everest (1973) about the 1965 Indian Everest Expedition. Ahluwalia also served as a consultant for the film.

Cast
Sunil Dutt as Vijay
Mallika Sarabhai as Kanchan
Ranjeet as Ranjeet
Rakesh Pandey as Captain George
Raju Desai as Raju
Master Bittoo as Bittoo
Nandita Thakur as Geeta Sharma
Shiv Kumar as Bhushan
P. Jairaj as Chief of Kathmandu Tower
Randhir as Plane Passenger who requested for soil
Ram Sethi as Plane passenger who tested calling button
Sunder as Plane Passenger who recognized Devraj by guess
Ram Mohan as Ram Singh
Karan Dewan
M. Rajan as Mr. Verma
Jankidas as Plane Passenger with a book in his hand
Dev Kumar Passenger at the airport

Music
The music was composed by Kalyanji-Anandji.
"Upar Wale Re Ajab Teri Maya" - Manna Dey
"Rahi Tere Sar Pe Duaao Ke Saaye Rahe" - Lata Mangeshkar
"Are Kaha Gaya Kidhar Gaya" - Kanchan, Baby Shivangi
"Pyar Jisko Kehte Hai Ek Baar Kiya Jata Hai" - Lata Mangeshkar

References

External links
 

1975 films
Indian action films
1970s Hindi-language films
1975 action films
Films scored by Kalyanji Anandji
Films set in the Himalayas
Films shot in Jammu and Kashmir